CH Collado Villalba was an ice hockey team in Collado Villalba, Madrid, Spain. The club consisted only of junior teams, and last participated in the Spanish U20 and U18 Leagues during the 2007-08 season. Their home arena was the Palacio de Hielo DREAMS, which has a capacity of 4,800 spectators.

References

External links
Profile on eurohockey.net

Ice hockey teams in Spain